The Milk And Honey Band are an English rock band formed by singer, songwriter and multi-instrumentalist Robert White (ex-Ring, Levitation and Zag And The Coloured Beads).

Sound
The music of The Milk And Honey Band is a mixture of pastoral English psychedelic rock,  accessible acoustic pop songwriting and space rock, with plentiful use of acoustic guitars and banked vocal harmonies plus extended melodic lead guitar and atmospheric production. XTC's Andy Partridge (the owner of their current record label) has described them as "a bit like The Moody Blues but with more energy and better songs. Or at times like a blissful Who.". Various reviewers have made comparisons to Crowded House, David Gray, Elliott Smith, Ron Sexsmith, The Beatles, The Beach Boys, XTC, Teenage Fanclub, The La's and Nick Drake.

A high proportion of the band's music has been recorded alone by its leader Robert White, who is an accomplished multi-instrumentalist and producer. The band's first album was effectively a Robert White solo recording, while subsequent albums have seen the band grow to a three-piece and eventually a five-piece with varying involvement from other members.

History

Roots in London psychedelia (early 1980s to 1993)

Robert White began his musical career in the south London free festival scene of the 1980s. Working in the psychedelic/experimental genre, he sang backing vocals and played bass guitar and keyboards for various bands, including Zag And The Coloured Beads, Ring, and "jazz punk" band Peru. Many bands in this grouping - such as the Purple People Eaters, The Dave Howard Singers and Cardiacs - interacted and shared members. Another member of Zag And The Coloured Beads was guitarist/bass player Michael Tubb – both he and Ring guitarist Christian Hayes would work with White on future projects.

In 1990, White and Hayes both joined the hotly tipped Levitation, an indie-psychedelic rock band which also featured former House Of Love guitarist Terry Bickers, bass player Joe Allen, violinist Johnny T and drummer David Francolini. White was the band’s keyboard player, third guitarist and main harmony singer: within its collective songwriting format, he also wrote a high proportion of the band’s material.

Levitation recorded three albums and several EPs, and gained a lot of press attention. Severe tensions within the band, however, ensured that it was a relatively short-lived unit. Both Johnny T and Joe Allen left after the first single (the latter was replaced by Laurence O'Keefe), and the mercurial frontman Bickers split very publicly with the band in 1993, to be briefly replaced by Steve Ludwin. By the end of 1994, Levitation had split up and its members went their separate ways (although Hayes, Francolini and O'Keefe would reunite four years later as Dark Star).

Early Milk And Honey Band (1994: Round The Sun)

The Milk And Honey Band began life as a Robert White solo project. It was recorded in between commitments with Levitation - in part, as an antidote to the frustrations of life in that band.

For the initial recordings, White sang lead vocals and played all instruments (drums, guitars, keyboards, bass guitar, mandolin and percussion) and also handled engineering and production. These tracks made up the project’s first album Round The Sun, which was released on Rough Trade Records in 1994. This album was more lo-fi than subsequent recordings, and featured musical elements that would be phased out of later Milk And Honey Band material. Several tracks had light classical or light-instrumental elements (emphasizing a nostalgic tone similar to that sometimes used in progressive rock) or a heavier dark-psychedelia approach.

Building a full band (1996–2000)

Following the collapse of Levitation, White relocated to Brighton and pursued a steady career in commercial music production, while simultaneously building up a stock of Milk And Honey Band songs for future release. In 1996, he presented Rough Trade with material for a new album but found that the label was unable to release it.

Opting to put together a full band, White recruited Richard Yale (bass, acoustic guitar, keyboards and backing vocals) and his former Zag And The Coloured Beads bandmate Michael Tubb (electric and acoustic guitars, keyboards and backing vocals). Both Tubb and Yale have stayed with The Milk and Honey Band ever since.

Regarding the band’s working arrangements, White has commented "I do write the majority of the tunes, but without Richard and Michael's help this group...well, it wouldn't be a group for starters. They keep me sane and generally massage my ego just enough to keep me buoyed without adding too much to the 'ego mountain that is Robert'. It's a bit like the old it's-my-ball-and-I-say-when-you-can-play-with-it syndrome, but as I happen to be the one lucky enough to have a studio at home then most of the recording/rehearsing activities of The Milk & Honey Band happen here."

Return to action (2001 to 2003: Boy From The Moon)

Attempts to sign the band to major labels proved unsuccessful due to the latter's insistence on attempting to reshape and direct the band (on one occasion, even attempting to demote White from the position of lead singer). In order to maintain control, White retreated and chose to write and record songs to his own schedule.

The next sign of Milk And Honey Band activity was in 2001 with the release of the Boy From The Moon album on the small Manchester independent label Uglyman Records. A much more polished effort than its predecessor, the record was atmospheric and detailed with a more spacious production sound. Uglyman's resources were limited and the record had difficulty in reaching a wide audience. However, one copy of the album reached XTC singer Andy Partridge, who was setting up his own record label and invited The Milk and Honey Band to sign to it.

Ape Records years (2004 to 2010)

The Milk And Honey Band signed a distribution deal with Partridge’s label, Ape Records, in 2004 and released a third album The Secret Life Of The Milk And Honey Band. This was in many ways a continuation of the work on the previous album. It contained four reissued songs from Boy From The Moon – the title track, "Sold My Star", "Satellite" and "Junior" (the last of which was retitled "Message")

The band later released two download-only albums via Ape. These were compilations of both previously released and unreleased material. *Crumbs!* Volume One included more Boy From The Moon tracks ("Touched The Sun", "Wonderful", "Can’t Sleep", and an a cappella version of "Sold My Star") as did *Crumbs!* Volume Two ("500 Miles", "You’re The One", "Saved Again" and an acoustic version of "San Francisco").

The Milk And Honey Band played their first low-key acoustic concerts in Brighton in 2004. The band later added two extra members for live concerts  - Dan Burke on keyboards, guitar and backing vocals and Christian Parsons (Polak, Astrid Williamson) on drums.

In March 2009, the band released their fourth full album, Dog Eared Moonlight, on Ape Records. At around the same time, Burke and Parsons were confirmed as full members of the band, although much of the music on the album had been recorded by Robert White on his own.

In November 2010, Ape Records released a download-only album "In Colour", comprising twelve tracks recorded at the same time as "Dog Eared Moonlight".  Three hundred physical copies of the album were also produced and made available. "In Colour" featured a more integrated full-band approach than Dog Eared Moonlight.

Current activity & Robert White solo work

Since the release of "In Colour", the Milk And Honey Band has been inactive (although no split has been confirmed, and the band has often had quiet periods). In the meantime, Robert White has begun releasing work under his own name.

In December 2010, a Robert White cover version of the Sea Nymphs song "Lily White's Party" (recorded in collaboration with Andy Partridge) appeared on Leader Of The Starry Skies: A Tribute To Tim Smith, Songbook 1, a fundraising compilation album to benefit the hospitalised Cardiacs/Sea Nymphs leader Tim Smith.

On 13 February 2013, Robert White released a solo cover version of the Gillian Welch song "Everything Is Free" as a video-only single.

In July 2020, Robert White announced the impending release of a new band album on social media. The album "Songs from Truleigh Hill" was released on CD, download and ultra-clear vinyl on the independent label Onomatopoeia Records in February 2021.

Discography

Albums
 Round The Sun (Rough Trade Records, 1994)
 Boy From The Moon (Uglyman Records, 2001)
 The Secret Life Of The Milk And Honey Band (Ape Records, 2004)
 Dog-Eared Moonlight (Ape Records, March 2009)
 In Colour (Ape Records, download only, November 2010)
 Songs From Truleigh Hill (Onomatopoeia Records, February 2021)

Singles/EPs
 "Boy From The Moon" (Ape Records, 2004 - re-recorded version with Andy Partridge on backing vocals and guitar)
 "Disappear" (Ape Records, February 2009 - download-only single with "Mind", an additional track not off the new album)

Compilations
 *Crumbs!* Volume One (Ape Records, download only, 2006)
 *Crumbs!* Volume Two (Ape Records, download only, 2006)

Members
 Robert White – lead vocals, guitars, keyboards, mandolin, percussion, drums, programming etc. (1993-present)
 Richard Yale – bass, acoustic guitar, keyboards and backing vocals (c. 1999-present)
 Michael Tubb – electric and acoustic guitars, keyboards and backing vocals (c. 1999-present)
 Dan Burke – keyboards, guitar and backing vocals (2004-present)
 Christian Parsons – drums (2004-present)

References

External links
 The Milk And Honey Band homepage
 The Milk And Honey Band @ MySpace
 Review of Dog-Eared Moonlight in Crawdaddy

English psychedelic rock music groups
English indie rock groups
Musical groups established in 1994
Musical groups from London